NGC 4207 is a spiral galaxy located about 50 million light-years away in the constellation Virgo. The galaxy was discovered by astronomer Heinrich d'Arrest on March 23, 1865. NGC 4207 is a member of the Virgo Cluster.

See also
 List of NGC objects (4001–5000)

References

External links
 

4207
39206
Virgo (constellation)
Virgo Cluster
Astronomical objects discovered in 1865
Spiral galaxies
7268